Demetric is a given name. Notable people with the name include:

Demetric Austin (born 1995), American basketball player
Demetric Evans (born 1979), American football player
Demetric Felton (born 1998), American football player

See also
Demetrice